New York F.C. (also known as the New York Field Club) was a name used by two early twentieth-century American soccer clubs.

History
Founded in 1916 as the New York Football Club, the team was originally a member of the semi-professional National Association Football League.  In 1921, the team name changed to New York Soccer Club as it became an inaugural member of the professional American Soccer League in 1921.  The club won the Southern New York State Football Association (a challenge cup) in 1922.

Year-by-year

Managers
 Hugh Magee (1920-1922)

New York Field Club II
The second New York Field Club was also a member of the American Soccer League.

Year-by-year

Defunct soccer clubs in New York (state)
Field
American Soccer League (1921–1933) teams
1916 establishments in New York (state)
Association football clubs established in 1916